Robert Smeets (born 10 November 1985) is an Australian retired professional tennis player. Though born in the Netherlands, Smeets moved to Australia aged 12 and took residency.

Personal life
Smeets has two sisters, called Karin and Cheyenne. His mother is Jeannette and father, Joe. He lives in Brisbane.

Tennis career
Smeets plays predominantly on the ATP Challenger Series and ITF Men's Circuit. However, he has enjoyed some success on the ATP Tour: at the 2008 Next Generation Adelaide International, he and Chris Guccione, as wildcards, reached the final of the doubles competition. On their way to the final they defeated number 2 seeds Andy Ram and Jonathan Erlich.

Smeets has also reached the second round of his home Grand Slam, the Australian Open, in 2007, by defeating Lukáš Lacko. Smeets reached the third round of the doubles competition, partnering Paul Baccanello in 2006.

In 2008 Smeets was granted a wildcard into the 2008 French Open main draw. He drew Tomáš Berdych, winning one game.

ATP Tour finals

Doubles runners-up (1)

Singles titles (10)

External links
 
 
 
 Smeets Recent Match Results
 Smeets World Ranking History

1985 births
Living people
Australian male tennis players
Dutch emigrants to Australia
Tennis players from Brisbane
Sportspeople from Ipswich, Queensland
People from Sliedrecht